Jervis Public Library is a historic library building located in Rome in Oneida County, New York. It was built in 1858 as the residence of John B. Jervis (1795–1885).  The original house is a rectangular, -story brick structure with a slate-covered gable roof and cupola. The facade features a 2-story portico supported by four massive Doric order brick columns.  A 2-story library extension was added in 1926 and in 1967 a modern library facility was added.  Also on the property is a 2-story carriage house built about 1860.

It was listed on the National Register of Historic Places in 1982.

References

External links
Jervis Public Library website

Libraries on the National Register of Historic Places in New York (state)
Houses completed in 1858
Georgian architecture in New York (state)
Buildings and structures in Oneida County, New York
Rome, New York
National Register of Historic Places in Oneida County, New York